Vie Nuove (Italian: New Ways) was a weekly popular magazine published in Rome, Italy, between 1946 and 1978. The magazine was one of the post-war publications of the Italian Communist Party which used it to attract larger sections of the population.

History and profile
The magazine was launched by the Communist Party in 1946 with the goal of informing the party members about recent developments. Another function of the magazine was to develop and disseminate a positive image of the Soviet Union focusing on its technical superiority over the Western capitalist countries. The founder was Luigi Longo who also edited the magazine. It was headquartered in Rome.

Historian Paolo Spriano was one of the contributors. Another contributor was Maria Musu. Italian director Pier Paolo Pasolini published his writings in a column in the magazine in which he also replied the questions of readers concerning literature, religion, Marxist theory, among others. The column was titled Dialoghi con Passolini (Italian: Passolini in Dialogue) and lasted from 28 May 1960 to 30 September 1965 with one year interruption between 1963 and September 1964. 

Vie Nuovo sponsored beauty contests like its sister publications L'Unità and Pattuglia . The magazine valued the female movie stars of the 1950s, including Gina Lollobrigida, Silvana Mangano and Sophia Loren and frequently covered articles about them. However, it was against photoromances arguing that these were the tools for bourgeois and capitalist propaganda which mortified women due to the fact they were sexually objectified in their photographs.

In 1952 Vie Nuovo reached the highest circulation selling 350,000 copies. Next year its circulation was 200,000 copies. The magazine sold 125-130,000 copies in 1963. Its circulation was between 114,000 and 120,000 copies in late 1966.

References

External links

1946 establishments in Italy
1978 disestablishments in Italy
Anti-fascism in Italy
Communist magazines
Defunct political magazines published in Italy
Italian-language magazines
Magazines established in 1946
Magazines disestablished in 1978
Weekly magazines published in Italy
Magazines published in Rome